Marta Gabriela Michetti Illia (born 28 May 1965) is an Argentine politician and was Vice President of Argentina from 2015 to 2019 during Mauricio Macri's administration. Before her, the only woman to serve as vice president was Isabel Perón.

Michetti is member of Republican Proposal and Cambiemos. She was Deputy Chief of Government in Buenos Aires from 2007 to 2009. She was National Deputy from 2009 to 2013 and served as National Senator for the City of Buenos Aires since 2013 to 2015.

Ideologically, she is considered conservative; religiously, she is Catholic.

She is a great-grandniece of former Argentine president Arturo Umberto Illia.

Early life and education
Marta Gabriela Michetti Illia was born in 1965 in the Buenos Aires Province town of Laprida into a family of Italian background. She earned a degree in International Relations at the Universidad del Salvador, Buenos Aires, in 1988. She completed a master's degree in Business Management and Integration in the UCES between 1993 and 1994 plus a specialization course on dispute settlement in the WTO, in Geneva, Switzerland in 2000; and a career specialization in University Management at the University of Ottawa, Canada in 2001.

Political career

Municipal
Michetti entered public service in 1989 in the Province of Buenos Aires, and the following year joined the executive staff as a technical adviser at the Argentine Ministry of Economy. Although employed as a professional rather than as a politician, Michetti was political, working through her church on social projects and becoming close to Carlos Auyero of the Christian Democratic Party and FrePaSo.

Michetti joined the Commitment to Change party led by Mauricio Macri in 2003. The party became part of the PRO movement, and she was elected that year to the Buenos Aires City Legislature, where she led the Commitment to Change caucus. Michetti gained recognition in 2006 while leading the inquiry committee looking into alleged negligence after a fire at the República Cromagnon nightclub led to the deaths of 194 people. The scandal led to the resignation of Aníbal Ibarra, then mayor of Buenos Aires.

Michetti was nominated as running mate for Mauricio Macri in 2007, and the ticket resulted elected to office of Mayor and Vice Mayor of the City of Buenos Aires with 61% of the vote, defeating Daniel Filmus and Carlos Heller of the Front for Victory. Michetti thus became the first woman elected Deputy Mayor of Buenos Aires. She directed two planning committees, Programa Puertas del Bicentenario  and the Consejo de Planeamiento Estratégico, and drew from her personal tragedy to lead the newly created Commission for the Inclusion and Full Participation of Persons with Disabilities (COPIDIS).

Legislative
Ahead of the 2009 elections for Congress, Michetti's name was frequently mentioned as a likely candidate for National Deputy, despite serving less than two years in municipal government. By April, her candidature appeared less likely given the manoeuvres of all the main parties. Much had also been made of her friendship with the leader of the rival Civic Coalition, Elisa Carrió. However, on 20 April Michetti resigned as Deputy Head of Government and confirmed that she would lead the PRO list for Buenos Aires for national deputies.

Vice President of Argentina (2015 - 2019)
She rejected to run for vice president under Macri in the 2015 national elections, and tried to run for mayor of Buenos Aires instead. Horacio Rodríguez Larreta defeated her during the primary elections, and would run for the Republican Proposal instead. Finally, she ran for vice president under Macri in 2015.

Michetti also collaborates with many NGOs to make possible for them to achieve their goals. In 2008 and 2009, for example she participated in the South American Business Forum as Speaker.

On 22 November 2015, after Cambiemos won the first ballotage in Argentina's history, Michetti became Vice President-elect of Argentina. She took office on 10 December 2015.

Inauguration

Michetti took office on 10 December 2015, along with President-elect Mauricio Macri, taking an oath before the President. Then the President, delivered a speech of 27 minutes in which he pledged his "support for an independent judiciary, to fight corruption and drug trafficking, the internal union of Argentina, universal social protection, create a twenty-first-century style of education and that everyone can have a roof, water and sewer". He also greeted those who were his competitors during the presidential elections.

Later she went to the Casa Rosada, where the received the presidential attributes in the White Hall at the hands of the Temporary President of the Senate, Federico Pinedo, President of the Chamber of Deputies Emilio Monzó and President of the Supreme Court Ricardo Lorenzetti. Minutes later she and the President went to the historic balcony where thousands of people waited in the Plaza de Mayo.

After being anointed Vice President, Michetti gave a reception at the San Martín Palace of Argentina Foreign Ministry to all the heads of state present: Michelle Bachelet from Chile, Horacio Cartes from Paraguay, Juan Manuel Santos from Colombia, Rafael Correa from Ecuador, Evo Morales from Bolivia, Dilma Rousseff from Brazil, and representatives of other countries attending the inauguration.

As vice president of the nation, she banned the exchange of tickets in the Senate for money.  From this measure, legislators can receive a maximum of $30,000 in cash for "mobility."  Passages that are not used within 30 days of the month cannot be accumulated.

Personal life
A car accident in 1994 seriously injured Michetti and left her in a wheelchair. Michetti has one son and had a long relationship with the journalist Eduardo Cura.

Michetti is a staunch Roman Catholic and an opponent of abortion legalization and same-sex marriages in her country.

Ancestry

References

External links
 

Vice presidents of Argentina
Members of the Argentine Chamber of Deputies elected in Buenos Aires
Members of the Argentine Senate for Buenos Aires
Deputy Chiefs of Government of Buenos Aires
1965 births
Living people
Women members of the Argentine Chamber of Deputies
Women members of the Argentine Senate
Commitment to Change politicians
Republican Proposal politicians
People from Buenos Aires Province
Argentine Roman Catholics
Argentine people of Italian descent
Politicians with paraplegia

21st-century Argentine politicians
Women vice presidents
University of Ottawa alumni
21st-century Argentine women politicians